Mola de Colldejou is a mountain chain in Catalonia, Spain located north of the Serra de Llaberia in the Catalan Pre-Coastal Range. 
The highest point is 921.8 m above sea level.

This mountain range is named after Colldejou village, located east of the range.

See also
Catalan Pre-Coastal Range
Mountains of Catalonia

References

External links

 Muntanyes de Tivissa-Vandellòs
 Consorci Serra de Llaberia

Llaberia
Baix Camp